Glaucomastix abaetensis, the Bahian sand dune lizard, is a species of teiid lizard endemic to Brazil.

References

Glaucomastix
Reptiles of Brazil
Endemic fauna of Brazil
Reptiles described in 2002
Taxa named by Eduardo Reis Dias
Taxa named by Carlos Frederico Duarte Rocha
Taxa named by Davor Vrcibradic